Co-operative College is a British educational charity dedicated to the promotion of co-operative values, ideas and principles within co-operatives, communities and society.

Origins and development

The Co-operative College was established in 1919 by the Co-operative Union with ten overseas students based on the second floor of Holyoake House, Manchester, and in 1943 the College became a charitable trust.

In 1945, Holyoake House was damaged by a blitz, and the Co-operative College was forced to relocate to Stanford Hall, near Loughborough, where it spent almost fifty years. Along the years that the College spent in Stanford, it ran residential courses in social/economic subjects for adult learners and a wide range of retail and management courses for co-operative employees.  In 1946, Dr Robert L. Marshall, OBE, MA, became the Principal and Chief Executive Officer.

The College has since returned to its original home at Holyoake House, and Dr Cilla Ross is Principal and Chief Executive.

Key areas of work

Researching co-operatives
Co-operative Learning and Development
Co-operatives Globally - International work
Co-operative Heritage
Schools and Young People

Schools and young people
The College, following the steps of Robert Owen, considers education as an underpinning element, and is involved in projects that reach school and young people in different fields.

In partnership with the Co-operative Group, the College is developing a network of schools specialised in Business and Enterprise.

In the U.K., the College is developing new models to run schools as co-operatives; the co-operative trust schools are schools that are set up like co-operatives.

Besides this, the Co-operative College also has its “Young Co-operative” programme, which any school can become involved with. This programme encourages pupils to create their own co-operative business.

See also
Co-operative studies

References

External links
 Official website
 

Universities and colleges in the United Kingdom
Co-operatives in the United Kingdom
Education in Manchester
Educational institutions established in 1919
1919 establishments in England